Anna Janssens (d. 1581), was a Dutch businessperson.  She was married to Hendrik van Duysborch (d. 1550) and took over the business of her spouse when she was widowed. She managed two breweries, land as well as a trading empire with base in Antwerp. She traded with England as well as Germany and the Spanish crown at the Canarie islands. She was a substantial member of the merchant class and one of the richest people in Antwerp at the time of her death. A street is named after her.

References

16th-century births
1581 deaths
People of the Habsburg Netherlands
16th-century Dutch businesswomen
16th-century Dutch businesspeople
Dutch brewers
Businesspeople of the Spanish Netherlands